The 2018 Harvard Crimson men's volleyball team represents Harvard University in the 2018 NCAA Division I & II men's volleyball season. The Crimson, led by tenth year head coach Brian Biase, play their home games at Malkin Athletic Center. The Crimson are members of the Eastern Intercollegiate Volleyball Association and were picked to finish fifth in the EIVA the preseason poll.

Roster

Schedule

 *-Indicates conference match.
 Times listed are Eastern Time Zone.

References

2018 in sports in Massachusetts
2018 NCAA Division I & II men's volleyball season
2018 Eastern Intercollegiate Volleyball Association season
2018 team